Sells Ltd, an advertising agency, was opened in 1869 in London. By 1900, it was the largest agency in the world with offices in London, Paris, Edinburgh and Montreal. In the 1950s, it made advertising history when it appointed the first woman to be a managing director in the business. Olive Hirst had joined Sells in 1931 as a typist and then worked across a number of departments. In January 1950, she was the first women to be appointed to the Board and in 1954 she took over the managing directors role.

The agency won the Layton Trophy in 1959.

The agency was merged with another in the 1960s.

References

Companies established in 1869
Defunct marketing companies of the United Kingdom
1869 establishments in England